Eugymnopeza is a genus of flies in the family Tachinidae.

Species
Eugymnopeza braueri Townsend, 1933
Eugymnopeza imparilis Herting, 1973

References

Dexiinae
Tachinidae genera
Diptera of Asia
Diptera of Europe
Taxa named by Charles Henry Tyler Townsend